Andrew Battershill is a Canadian writer, whose debut novel Pillow was a longlisted nominee for the Scotiabank Giller Prize and the Sunburst Award, and a finalist for the Kobo Emerging Writer Prize, in 2016.

He was cofounder with Jeremy Hanson-Finger of the online literary magazine Dragnet Magazine.

He won the 2019 ReLit Award for fiction for his novel Marry, Bang, Kill.

Originally from British Columbia, he studied creative writing at the University of Toronto, and served as the 2017-2018 Writer-in-Residence at the Regina Public Library. He is the brother of writer Claire Battershill.

References

External links

21st-century Canadian novelists
Canadian male novelists
Writers from British Columbia
Living people
Place of birth missing (living people)
Year of birth missing (living people)
21st-century Canadian male writers
University of Toronto alumni